Edmund Platt (February 2, 1865 – August 7, 1939) was an American politician and corporate executive who served as the 4th vice chairman of the Federal Reserve from 1920 to 1930. A member of the Republican Party, he had represented  in the United States House of Representatives from 1913 to 1920.

Born in Poughkeepsie, New York he attended a private school and Riverview Academy. He graduated from Eastman Business College in Poughkeepsie and learned the printer's trade. He graduated from Harvard University in 1888 and taught school and studied law. He moved to Wisconsin and edited the Superior Evening Telegram in 1890 and 1891. He returned to Poughkeepsie in 1891 and engaged in editing and publishing the Poughkeepsie Eagle; he was also a member of the board of water commissioners of Poughkeepsie.

Platt was elected as a Republican to the Sixty-third and to the three succeeding Congresses and held office from March 4, 1913 to June 7, 1920, when he resigned to accept appointment by President Woodrow Wilson to the Federal Reserve Board. While in the House of Representatives, he was chairman of the Committee on Banking and Currency (Sixty-sixth Congress). Platt became vice governor of the Federal Reserve Board in August 1920 and served until 1930 when he resigned. He returned to Poughkeepsie and engaged in an extensive banking business; he died in Chazy, New York while on a visit in 1939; interment was in the Poughkeepsie Rural Cemetery.

References

External links
Statements and Speeches of Edmund Platt

1865 births
1939 deaths
American newspaper editors
Burials at Poughkeepsie Rural Cemetery
Harvard University alumni
Journalists from New York (state)
Politicians from Poughkeepsie, New York
Republican Party members of the United States House of Representatives from New York (state)
Vice Chairs of the Federal Reserve
Woodrow Wilson administration personnel
Harding administration personnel
Coolidge administration personnel
Hoover administration personnel